is a former Japanese football player.

Playing career
Nakamura was born in Ibaraki Prefecture on April 23, 1981. After graduating from high school, he joined newly was promoted to J2 League club, Mito HollyHock based in his local in 2000. On July 28, he debuted as substitute midfielder from the 55th minute against Omiya Ardija. However he could only play this match and retired end of 2000 season.

Club statistics

References

External links

1981 births
Living people
Association football people from Ibaraki Prefecture
Japanese footballers
J2 League players
Mito HollyHock players
Association football midfielders